The International Emmy Award for Best Comedy Series is presented by the International Academy of Television Arts & Sciences (IATAS) to the best comedy television series, produced and initially aired outside the United States.

Rules and regulations 
Under the International Academy's rules, the award is given to a program primarily devoted to humor with scripted dialogue (ie skit, comedy, sitcom, parodies, stand-up, etc.). The program should fit the minimum format length of a televised half-hour time slot. If the show is a drama, the comedy aspect should be predominant. If the show is a series, only one episode is eligible as a representative. Multiple submissions from the same series are not permitted.

Winners and nominees

2000s

2010s

2020s

References

External links
 

Comedy